The 2011 Diamond Head Classic was a mid-season eight-team college basketball tournament played on December 22, 23, and 25 at the Stan Sheriff Center in Honolulu, Hawaii. It was the third annual Diamond Head Classic tournament and was part of the 2011–12 NCAA Division I men's basketball season. Kansas State defeated Long Beach State to win the tournament championship. Rodney McGruder was named the tournament's MVP.

Bracket
Source

All-tournament team

Source

References

Diamond Head Classic
Diamond Head Classic
2011 in sports in Hawaii